The Official Compilation of Federal Legislation (AS; , RO; , RU) is the federal government gazette of Switzerland. All Swiss federal laws and ordinances, as well as amendments to them, enter into force by chronological publication in the AS/RO/RU.

It is issued in the three official languages of Switzerland: German, French and Italian. All three language editions are equally valid. It is published by the Federal Chancellery of Switzerland in the form of weekly supplements to loose leaf binders. Since 1999, they have been also made available on the Internet in PDF format.

See also 
 Law of Switzerland
 Systematic Compilation of Federal Legislation
 Federal Gazette
 United States Statutes at Large
 Federal Register
 Official Journal of the European Union

References

External links 
 Amtliche Sammlung 
 Recueil officiel 
 Raccolta ufficiale 

Law of Switzerland
Switzerland Official Collection of Federal Law